Monchy-Saint-Éloi is a commune in the Oise department in northern France.

Personalities
It is the resting place of artist Leon Bonnat.

See also
 Communes of the Oise department

References

Communes of Oise